Star Wars: Galaxy of Heroes is a mobile collectible RPG game. The game received a soft launch in Australia during October 2015, and was formally released on November 24, 2015.

Premise
Galaxy of Heroes is set in a cantina in a distant corner of the Star Wars galaxy, where people of varying species compete in simulated holographic battles involving notable figures throughout Star Wars history for fame and fortune.

Gameplay 

Galaxy of Heroes allows players to collect Star Wars characters from both the main canonical universe established after Lucasfilm was acquired by The Walt Disney Company and the Legends-canon Star Wars: Knights of the Old Republic series, create teams with them, and use them to fight in turn-based battles. There are multiple ways to collect characters: some are given to players immediately, whereas others are gained via game play or as in-game rewards in the form of shards that are earned by players to unlock and or promote their characters. Shards can either be earned from battles or bought from a shop. Maximizing one non-event character's rarity to seven stars unlocks a special shop in which excess shards from seven-star non-event heroes can be exchanged for gear. The shard amount needed for the character to be unlocked will also correspond to their starting star level, which can range from one to seven stars. Characters can be promoted to a max of seven stars with each additional star increasing their power. There are also training droids that can provide varying levels of experience points to level up characters.  Gear, mods, and ability parts can all upgrade characters, although some gear can primarily be won only from battles for one particular side of the Force, to encourage players to play on both sides. The maximum level cap in Star Wars: Galaxy of Heroes is 85, which was changed from the previous level cap of 80 (previously 70). The maximum gear level is gear 13; beyond this, characters improve their "Mastery" with Relic Amplifiers, which have a maximum of level 9 (previously 8). Players level up their user level by gaining experience by completing daily quests or completing battles. The main currencies of the game are "credits" and "crystals". Credits can be used to train a hero, buy things from the store, obtain a hero when you have enough shards or promote a hero's star rarity. Crystals can be used to buy packs from the store, buy credits, acquire character shards, and energy and arena attempt refreshes. Crystals can be bought with money or can be earned as rewards from arena and daily challenges.

Battles are divided up into rounds, with the character with the highest speed stat going first. Each team consists of up to five (six with an ally or summoned unit) different hologram avatars which battle until defeated or retreated. Battles are turn-based, again based on the speed attribute, where the combatants apply various buffs to their own team and inflict debuffs on the opponent all the while trying to deal the most overall damage and have the last character alive.

Modes 
There are various modes for players to engage in, including squad arena (player vs. player), dark and light side battles, cantina, galactic wars, raids, and various special events. All modes are played versus the computer controlled AI, including the squad arena battles in which the AI controls a player-created team.

Center Table:
Light Side Characters Campaign: Lead a squad of light side heroes to defeat dark side enemies in 3-wave battles.
Dark Side Characters Campaign: Lead a squad of dark side villains to defeat light side enemies in 3-wave battles.

Upper Center Table:
Shipments: Purchase randomly available character shards and gear with crystals and credits, which change every six hours.
Store: Purchase data cards to get characters and consumable resource items, or redeem a Bronzium data card with earned Ally Points.

Upper Left Table:
Neutral Cantina Campaign: Lead a squad of heroes and villains to defeat unlikely combinations of enemies in 3-wave battles.
Neutral Mod Battles Campaign: Engage in 5-wave battles against enemies enhanced by particular mods to earn low-grade mods and slicing parts.
Mod Challenges: Win mod battles to earn better mods of a particular stat.

Upper Right Tables:
Squad Arena: Battle against other player squads in 5-on-5 battles, while competing for daily prizes based on ranking.
Galactic Battles: Includes two campaigns: War (formerly Galactic War), which involves battling 12 player-made teams, and Conquest, a 5-stage mode with two difficulties and exclusive rewards.

Lower Left Tables:
Daily Challenges: Complete daily challenges to obtain important resources and select gear.
Grand Arena Championships: Players at maximum level are grouped into 8 and pitted against three opponents in a mini-Territory Battle with rare gear and slicing parts at stake.

Lower Right Tables:
Special Event Battles: Participate in special battles reflecting Star Wars scenarios to earn rewards
Shard Shop Shipments: Purchase gear or shards for General Grievous with currency redeemed from excess 7-star character shards
Scavenger: Make top-gear characters even stronger by pooling together spare parts to upgrade their personal artifacts, called relics.

"Back Room" Areas:
Far Left, Guilds
Guild Raids: Work together to defeat a powerful boss and earn rare gear and shards for a special character.
Territory Battles: Work together to drive enemy armies away from a large swath of territory.
Guild Shipments: Purchase items with guild tokens earned from guild victories, including character shards.
Guild Member Item Requests/Donations: Allows a guild member to donate or request gear items.
Guild Management: Review the guild's current statistics along with a list of members.
Guild Search: Search for other guilds.

Far Right, Ships
Fleet Arena: Pit your created fleet against other player's fleets and compete for daily rewards based on ranking.
Daily Ship Challenges: Complete daily challenges to earn ship resources.
Fleet Arena Store: Use currency earned from arena ranking to buy blueprints, shards and high-grade ability materials.
Neutral Fleet Battles: Use your fleet to defeat computer-controlled enemy fleets, composed of heroes, villains or both, in single-wave 3-on-3 battles.

Guilds
Guilds were introduced to the game in April 2016. As with most games, guilds in Star Wars: Galaxy of Heroes consist of players teaming together to achieve common goals. In this game, guilds consist of a maximum of 50 players that can go on raids, and participate in both Territory Wars and Territory Battles. The guild search interfaces received a small update in April 2021.

Raids 
Raids were added to the game in April 2016 with the introduction of the Rancor. Guilds send in teams of five hologram avatars at a time to battle multiple powerful bosses across four different stages, with all bosses sharing a universal health bar that is split into fourths, one for each stage, which decreases as the damage the guild inflicts begins to accumulate.  Once it empties completely, the raid is won and participating members will be given rewards.

There are four types of raids, each set in a different era and known for its unique difficulties. One lets the player fight a Rancor, another lets the player battle a Separatist AAT, while in another the player faces off against ancient Sith warriors, along with Darth Nihilus, Darth Sion and Darth Traya, all from the Knights of the Old Republic series, the last being a remastered version of the Rancor The first raid introduced, the rancor, is considered easy by many players, and a single player can complete the raid. There are 7 different tiers of difficulty for this raid, including Heroic Rancor, also known as HPIT. This raid requires 7 star characters and is the only place to acquire Han Solo shards (except for the Galactic Bounty I event). The second raid added to the game is Tank Takedown, where a guild takes on General Grievous, A Separatist AAT, and Rocket and Battle Droids. Although this raid is harder than Rancor, it is still easy to higher level guilds, and some players are able to finish this raid on their own. This raid only has 2 tiers, including Heroic AAT, also known as HAAT. The newest raid, The Sith Triumvirate Raid (STR), is also the hardest, however with the addition of the Galactic Legend Supreme Leader Kylo Ren, this raid is possible for a single player to beat like the others. Like Rancor, this raid has 7 Tiers, including Heroic. The Heroic Sith Triumvirate Raid (HSTR) is in high demand by players, with many of them moving to guilds that can complete HSTR. This raid also led to the nerf and rework of many factions, most notably the Nightsisters. The heroic version of this raid gives out Darth Traya shards, mod salvages (introduced in Mods 2.0) and Gear 12+ pieces, which are required to fill slots 4 and 5 of the gear level 12. The only other place to get G12+ gear is the weekly shipments store. On December 9, 2020 The Pit Challenge tier was added into the game and brought with it Relic 8. The pieces needed for Relic 8 dropped exclusively in the new raid. This addition was very controversial as it required a minimum Relic Level of 5 to participate, and the mechanics involved extreme cooperation between guildmates. The necessity for this cooperation caused the dissolution of many high-level guilds, which, along with widespread backlash from the player base, prompted Capital Games to update the raid's mechanics in March 2021.

Ships
Ship battles were added on November 22, 2016. This feature allows players to control various spaceships through their captains and pilots. The vehicles are controlled and played similarly to the main game with the player's characters, with the addition of an unassailable capital ship, which offers leadership bonuses, special abilities, and additional attacks.

23 different ships were available at the launch of the new feature. As of January 2023, there are now 51 ships and 10 capital ships. Ships enhancement mirrors that of characters, each area available for improvement - rarity, level, skill level - requiring a different, special currency. These currencies are acquired through daily challenges and daily reward for fleet arena standing.

Mods
Mods (short for modifications) are an optional upgrade for characters within the game. Once the player's account reaches level 50, Mods become available to any of their characters that are level 50 or above. There are different categories of mods, each of which yields a different primary effect on the stats of the character that has equipped it. This effect allows players to increase statistical areas of their characters to yield better performance in battle.

In the late summer of 2018, EA released an update that significantly changed how mods worked, dubbed "Mods 2.0".  The update grants players more freedom on what kinds of mods they would like to acquire by eliminating character faction requirements from the Mod Challenges, and provides suggestions for each character on which mod types should be used.  In addition, mods graded as Mark V (the original, typical Mark limit) can be "sliced" to increase their color tier and level up extra secondary stats, and can be sliced once more to reach an extra-higher, exclusive Mark VI tier.  In October 2021, players were given the ability to slice their Mark VI mods' color tier to the maximum of tier 6-A (Mark VI, color A). Slicing requires parts acquired from an extra set of very difficult mod battles against characters of a certain faction, while all mod battles now use a separate pool of energy. The slicing materials needed to slice mods from 6-E to 6-A were added as exclusive rewards in the Galactic Challenges, then also to Conquest when the latter was released.

Reception

The game has received a mixed response from critics, currently holding a 70/100 rating on Metacritic based on 8 reviews. As of November 2021, the game has had 100 million players.

In other media
In 2019, one of the game's many characters, the Jedi Knight Guardian, made an appearance in the first issue of the Marvel comic book series Star Wars: Age of Republic - Obi-Wan Kenobi, which identifies her as Jedi Master Tosan.
GameStop exclusively released a special action figure based on the mythic character Jedi Knight Revan on February 10, 2020.

References

External links 
 
 Capital Games website

2015 video games
Android (operating system) games
Electronic Arts games
IOS games
Role-playing video games
Video games developed in the United States